Jessica Moore and Varatchaya Wongteanchai were the defending champions, but chose not to compete together. Moore played alongside Prarthana Thombare, but lost in the quarterfinals to Irina-Camelia Begu and Raluca Olaru. Wongteanchai teamed up with Alona Fomina, but lost in the first round to Jaqueline Cristian and Cristina Dinu.

Begu and Olaru went on to win the title, defeating Elise Mertens and Demi Schuurs in the final 6–3, 6–3.

Seeds

Draw

Draw

References
 Main Draw

BRD Bucharest Open - Doubles
2017 Doubles